Robert Irwin (December 17, 1865 – May 16, 1941) was a merchant and political figure in Nova Scotia, Canada, and father of Robert Grandy and Prescott St. Clair. He represented Shelburne County in the Nova Scotia House of Assembly from 1906 to 1925 as a Liberal member. Irwin was the 17th Lieutenant Governor of Nova Scotia from 1937 to 1940.

Life and career
He was born in Shelburne, Nova Scotia, the son of Robert Gore Irwin and Isabel Archer, and was educated there. Irwin worked for fifteen years as a travelling salesman before establishing a lumber and dry goods business at Shelburne. In 1894, he married Mary Prescott McGill. Irwin was speaker for the provincial assembly from 1917 to 1925. He died in Shelburne. His brother Harry Irwin was Hawaii Attorney General and a judge in Hawaii. His brother Fred was a physician and surgeon in Hawaii. They also had a brother named Archer.

References 

 
 

1865 births
1941 deaths
Nova Scotia Liberal Party MLAs
Speakers of the Nova Scotia House of Assembly
Lieutenant Governors of Nova Scotia